State Route 131 (SR-131) is a  state highway in Bluffdale, Utah, United States, routed entirely on Porter Rockwell Boulevard. The open section is a  spur southwest from 14600 South (SR-140), but when completed it will extend west to Redwood Road (SR-68).

Route description

Open section
As of June 2021, the west end of the route is at the intersection of Porter Rockwell Boulevard and Harmon Day Drive. From this point, SR-131 proceeds northeast on Porter Rockwell Boulevard as a two-lane road with a center turn lane. It passes through newer developments in Bluffdale, as well as Summit Academy High School. The route straightens out to the north to continue on to its eastern terminus at an intersection with 14600 South (SR-140), just south of the Utah State Prison.

Unopened section
A new bridge is under construction that will cross the Utah and Salt Lake Canal, Jordan River, tracks for the Union Pacific Railroad and FrontRunner commuter rail, and Jordan and Salt Lake City Canal. The east end of the bridge will connect with a  section completed (but unopened) five-lane section of the section of the highway that heads northeast to its intersection with Harmon Day Drive.

History
The route was created by an action of the Utah Transportation Commission on September 16, 2016, which officially designated SR-131 along Porter Rockwell Boulevard from SR-68 to SR-140. In exchange, the section of SR-140 west of 800 West was cancelled.

Major intersections

See also

 List of state highways in Utah

References

External links

 Highway Reference Information: Route 131 (PDF)
 State Road Resolutions: Route 131 (PDF)

131
 131